Markkus Keel (born 18 August 1995) is an Estonian volleyball player. He is a member of the Estonian national team since 2017 and represented his country at the 2019 European Volleyball Championship.

He started his professional career in club Pärnu VK.

His father is a volleyball player and coach Avo Keel. His brother is a volleyball player Martti Keel.

References

Living people
1995 births
Estonian men's volleyball players
Estonian expatriate volleyball players
Estonian expatriate sportspeople in Austria
Expatriate volleyball players in Austria
Estonian expatriate sportspeople in Belgium
Expatriate volleyball players in Belgium
Estonian expatriate sportspeople in Finland
Expatriate volleyball players in Finland
Estonian expatriate sportspeople in France
Expatriate volleyball players in France
Estonian expatriate sportspeople in Iran
Expatriate volleyball players in Iran
Estonian beach volleyball players